The William Penn Stakes was an American Thoroughbred horse race run between 1942 and 1956 at Garden State Park Racetrack in Camden, New Jersey. A race for two-year-old colts and geldings on dirt, it was contested at a distance of six furlongs from inception thru 1947 after which it was shortened to five furlongs.

Garden State Park opened in 1942. The city of Camden is situated across the Delaware River from Philadelphia, Pennsylvania, a city with more than twenty times the population of Camden which provided an extremely important source from which to draw patrons for the racetrack. The William Penn Stakes honors the founder of the Province of Pennsylvania.

Successful from almost the beginning as a result of participation by some big-name stables, going into 1948 the William Penn Stakes had become one of the track's most popular races. 

When Blue Peter got his third Camden track record in winning the 1948 race it would add further lustre to the event and for the 1949 edition the 35,110 patrons who showed up would be the largest crowd of the season.    Once again speed would be front at center when, in his May 13, 1950 career debut, Lord Putnam broke Garden State Park's track record for five furlongs. In winning the May 27 William Penn Stakes, Lord Putnam set a new stakes record and then in his next outing remarkably broke a different track's record time, this one at Monmouth Park in Oceanport, New Jersey.

By 1953 more and more of the major New York owned and based stables were sending their two-year-olds to compete in the William Penn Stakes. Among them were the likes of Maine Chance Farm, owned by cosmetics magnate Elizabeth Arden, the Wheatley Stable of Gladys Mills Phipps and her brother, Ogden Livingston Mills, as well as the Brookmeade Stable belonging to automobile heiress Isabel Dodge Sloane. Unfortunately for them, all were beaten in the 1953 edition by Duc De Fer, a local horse bred and raced by J. Warfield Rodgers. Duc De Fer would race successfully for five years and retire with earnings of $225,791 (about $2.34 million in 2021). Increased purses at the New York tracks saw a significant drop off in their participation in the 1954 running. The effect would see the William Penn Stakes placed on hiatus in 1955 and while it was brought back on May 9, 1956, that would be its final running.

In 1957, the track's owners dropped the William Penn Stakes to help them supplement the purse for the Garden State Stakes, also a race for two-year old colts and geldings. The purse would be the largest offered anywhere in the world.

Records
Speed record:
 0:58.80 @ 5 furlongs: Lord Putnam (1950)
 1:11.40 @ 6 furlongs: Jobstown (1946)

Most wins by a jockey:
 2 - Nick Wall (1943, 1950)
 2 - John Gilbert (1945, 1949)
 2 - Sam Boulmetis (1952, 1956)

Most wins by a trainer:
 No trainer won this race more than once.

Most wins by an owner:
 No owner won this race more than once.

Winners

References

Discontinued horse races in the United States
Flat horse races for two-year-olds
Garden State Park Racetrack
Horse races in New Jersey
Recurring sporting events established in 1942
Recurring sporting events disestablished in 1957